Nikita Tsarenko (born 9 July 2002) is a Belarusian professional footballer, who plays for Gomel.

Honours
Gomel
Belarusian Cup winner: 2021–22

References

External links 
 
 

2002 births
Living people
Belarusian footballers
Association football midfielders
FC Osipovichi players
FC Gomel players